The following page lists most power stations that run on wave power. Wave farms are classified into 8 types based on the technology used, such as Surface-following attenuator, Point absorber, Oscillating wave surge converter, Oscillating water column, Overtopping/Terminator, Submerged pressure differential, Bulge wave device, and Rotating mass.

Wave farms

See also 

 Marine power

References

External links
 Worlds First Grid-connected wave power World’s first grid-connected wave power station switched on in Australia

Wave